Austria competed at the 1994 Winter Olympics in Lillehammer, Norway.

Medalists

Competitors
The following is the list of number of competitors in the Games.

Alpine skiing

Men

Women

Biathlon

Men

Bobsleigh

Cross-country skiing

Men

Freestyle skiing

Men

Ice hockey

Men's team competition
Team roster
Michael Puschacher
Brian Stankiewicz
Claus Dalpiaz
Martin Krainz
Jim Burton
Engelbert Linder
Mike Shea
Rob Doyle
Herbert Hohenberger
Michael Güntner
Martin Ulrich
Karl Heinzle
Andreas Pusnik
Marty Dallman
Gerhard Pusnik
Manfred Mühr
Rick Nasheim
Günther Lanzinger
Gerald Ressmann
Ken Strong
Werner Kerth
Wolfgang Kromp
Dieter Kalt
Head coach: Ken Tyler
Results

Luge

Men

Women

Nordic combined

Ski jumping

Speed skating

Men

Women

References

Sources
Official Olympic Reports
International Olympic Committee results database

Nations at the 1994 Winter Olympics
1994
Winter Olympics